Kiwi Airlines was the name of two airlines operating in the late 1990s 

 Kiwi International Air Lines operating in the United States
 Kiwi Travel International Airlines operating as Kiwi Airlines between New Zealand and Australia (1994-1996)

See also
 Kiwi Regional Airlines operating in New Zealand in 2015–16.